This is a list of members of the European Parliament for the Luxembourg in the 2019 to 2024 session.

See 2019 European Parliament election in Luxembourg for further information on these elections in Luxembourg.

List 
This table can be sorted by party or party group: click the symbol at the top of the appropriate column.

References

2019
List
Luxembourg